Racial uplift is a term within the African American community that motivates educated blacks to be responsible in the lifting of their race. This concept traced back to the late 1800s, introduced by black elites, such as W. E. B. Du Bois, Booker T. Washington, and African American musicians like Florence Price, who were significant contributors. During the beginnings of racial uplift, hymns and negro spirituals played a vital role in shaping the spiritual culture of African Americans. Although these musical selections are mainly prevalent inside the black church, contemporary gospel music has been utilized for the liberation and uplift of the oppressed black race. Aside from music, African American leaders have used concepts such as Du Bois's double consciousness that describe the idea of blackness and the complexities of identity in the various lens in which the black race envisions themselves in American society.

The talented tenth is a primary example of racial uplift for African Americans. Du Bois was one of the black elites that steered the talented tenth to become prevalent and of importance. Struggling to make racial uplift become relevant, he believed that the black leaders that were sent out to be representatives of their community did not always return to their communities.

Correlation with eugenics 
Eugenics is seen throughout the time of racial uplift due to the control that was placed on people of African American descent. Eugenics play a role in how racial uplift is viewed, which includes how people are made to think, look, and create community. Some African Americans, both then and now, are said to take on roles which are prevailing in other cultures, making them alter the way in which they choose to live their life. In W.E.B Du Bois's book, The Souls of Black Folk, he discusses his view on how African Americans are perceived both to themselves and to the ones who are around them, with the term double consciousness. Du Bois himself is known as the father of sociology and Pan-Africanism, the idea of all people from African descent becoming unified across the world.

Other African American authors such as Nathan Hare have written books which attest to eugenics not only being seen in the African American community but also its promoter of liberation through racial uplift. In Nathan Hare's The Black Anglo-Saxons, he writes about how African Americans had begun to conform with other races and abandon their own cultural identity. Although they are now seen as a higher class, these individuals do not engage in racial uplift to guide other African Americans to where they are. Like many other Nathan Hare books, this book has caused African Americans to realize that not everyone who succeeds in life is willing to come back and give to their community. Nathan Hare himself has written many books which deal with the concept of racial uplift and how African Americans operate in a society where eugenics exist.

Beauty culture 
With racial uplift being seen as "self-help" for black people, other aspects focused on which African Americans were able to receive an education. The beauty culture played a role in who was sent out as a representative for the African American community. In W.E.B. Du Bois's book The Souls of Black Folk, he discusses how hair type, color, and attitude determined who was capable of receiving an education and could return to help the black community with racial uplift. If the "wrong" individuals are sent out, then the community will be considered doomed due to that individual's incapability to perform at a certain level. Touching on eugenics, many African Americans were unaware of how the way they look, their mannerisms, and how they interact with those around them affect their capability to be well educated. With the color of a person's skin being the first physical feature people saw during this time, this led to rising colorism, a contradicting approach to racial uplift.

Colorism 
Colorism, sometimes known as shadism, is when someone is treated differently due to the color of their skin by someone in their own race. People of light shades are said to be more favorable and according to W.E.B. Du Bois, these were the individuals that would have an easier time with receiving an education. Then, take that same knowledge that they learned and teach the community they live in. During this time, a test known as the "brown paper bag test" was used to assess the shade of an African American. This test was not only used to determine who could attend Historically Black Colleges during the late 1800s and early 1900s, but also to be seen as a leader or relevant to their own kind. In connection with eugenics, colorism is a form of discrimination that excludes someone because of being a darker shade. With racial uplift, it is challenging for African Americans to uplift one another if they are concentrating on one's skin tone.

See also 
Booker T. Washington
Double consciousness
Their Eyes Were Watching God

References

Sociological terminology